Chelu (also Romanized as Chelū) is a village in Esfandaqeh Rural District, in the Central District of Jiroft County, Kerman Province, Iran. At the 2006 census, its population was 14, in 4 families.

References 

Populated places in Jiroft County